St. Xavier's College in Simdega is a Liberal arts college in India. The college is named after Francis Xavier, the 16th-century Spanish Jesuit saint.

The college was established and founded in the year 2016 which being the realisation of the vision of Belgian Jesuits, Father Jan-Baptist Stockman and Father Constant Lievens, who brought the Society of Jesus to Chota Nagpur Division of British India in 1869.

The college is run by Indian Jesuits, with special consideration to Catholic students. It offers undergraduate courses in Humanities and Commerce.

History 
The college was established by the Jesuits of Ranchi province. The college was officially inaugurated on the feast of Nativity of Mary on 2016. The college is a vision of the Belgian Jesuits who have established several educational institutions in the area including the prestigious St. Mary School.

Religious Affiliation 
The College is Roman Catholic and the Society of Jesus exercises responsibility over it through a Governing Body whose chairman is the Provincial of the Ranchi Province of the Society. St. Xavier's College is named after Francis Xavier, a Spanish Jesuit saint of the Sixteenth century who travelled to India. The College seeks to give an all-round formation, inculcating both human and spiritual values. It gives special consideration to Roman Catholics under the minority rights in Article 30, Constitution of India for whose education the college was founded.

Accreditation 
St. Xavier's College is accredited and affiliated to Ranchi University. It is accredited by the University with the task of preparing students for degrees in Humanities and Commerce.

Courses 
Presently, the college remains mainly an undergraduate institution.

Undergraduate Degree 
Undergraduate courses are of total duration of three years. Applicants seeking admissions are evaluated based on their academic performance in the Higher Secondary School Certificate (HSC) examination.
 Bachelor of Arts (B.A.)
 Bachelor of Commerce (B. Com.)

Sister Institution 
St. Xavier's College, Ranchi is a sister institution established by the Jesuits of Ranchi Province.

See also
Education in India
Simdega

References

External links

Colleges affiliated to Ranchi University
Jesuit universities and colleges in India
Simdega district
Educational institutions established in 2016
2016 establishments in Jharkhand